Charles Kjerulf  (March 22, 1858 - August 22, 1919) was a Danish composer and music critic.

See also
List of Danish composers

References

This article was initially translated from the Danish Wikipedia.

Danish composers
Male composers
1858 births
1919 deaths